Vejar or Véjar may refer to:

Vejar, Trebnje, a village in the Municipality of Trebnje, southeastern Slovenia

People with the surname
Mike Vejar (born 1943), American television director
Sergio Véjar (1928–2009), Mexican cinematographer and screenwriter